Bouffon (English originally from French: "farceur", "comique", "jester") is a modern French theater term that was re-coined in the early 1960s by Jacques Lecoq at his L'École Internationale de Théâtre Jacques Lecoq in Paris to describe a specific style of performance work that has a main focus in the art of mockery. The word gave rise to the English word buffoon.

Etymology and early history
The word bouffon comes from a Latin verb: , to puff (i.e., to fill the cheeks with air); the word "Buffo" was used in the Theatre of ancient Rome by those who appeared on the stage with their cheeks blown up; when they received blows they would make a great noise, causing the audience to laugh. The usage of the word bouffon comes from French and has entered English theatrical language through the work of Jacques Lecoq and his pedagogic inquiry into performance approaches of comedy, leading him to create dynamic classroom exercises that explored elements of burlesque, commedia dell'arte, farce, gallows humor, parody, satire, slapstick, etc. that collectively influenced the development of modern bouffon performance work.

Philippe Gaulier, a contemporary of LeCoq, explains bouffon in his book The Tormentor.

In popular culture
In the American TV series Baskets, the main character is a dropout from the famous Bouffon school in Paris.  There are scenes depicting him in class at the school with lectures in French.

Actor  Sacha Baron Cohen was inspired by Bouffon comedy after learning about the concept in his 20s from Philippe Gaulier, a famous clown teacher.

See also
 Jester
 Opéra bouffon
 Opera buffa

References

1960s neologisms
Ancient Roman theatre
Entertainment occupations
French words and phrases
Jesters
Stage terminology
Theatre in France